Aimee Phillips  (born 6 May 1991) is a New Zealand footballer who plays as a forward for the New Zealand women's national football team. Her last National team appearance was in 2019 where she represented New Zealand against North Korea. She was part of the team at the 2016 Algarve Cup. 

In 2018, she represented ZFK Spartak Subotica where she made 9 (apps) and scored 6 (gls) in the Serbian SuperLiga and won the Serbian Superliga. In June 2018, she moved to Cardiff Met. Ladies F.C. to play in the UEFA Champions League qualifying rounds. Cardiff Met. Ladies F.C. lost 3–2 to WFC Zhytlobud-1 Kharkiv, 5–2 to CFF Olimpia Cluj and drew 2–2 with Birkirkara F.C. She scored 1 (gls) and 2 (assists) during the UEFA Champions League.

International goals

References

External links
 New Zealand player profile'
 Aimee Phillips Role Model'
 Aimee Phillips lands professional football contract in Europe'
 Inspirational Aimee'
Football Ferns Make History in Brazil'
Women's World Football Show'
Aimee Phillips unlocks Defense'
Goal-Hungry Kiwis Dominate PNG'

1991 births
Living people
New Zealand women's association footballers
Place of birth missing (living people)
Women's association football forwards
New Zealand women's international footballers
Cardiff Met. Ladies F.C. players
Expatriate women's footballers in Wales
ŽFK Spartak Subotica players
FF USV Jena players
Frauen-Bundesliga players